The 1970 FIBA World Championship was the 6th FIBA World Championship, the international basketball world championship for men's teams. It was hosted by Yugoslavia in Sarajevo, Split, Karlovac, Skopje and Ljubljana, from 10 to 24 May 1970. It was the first ever FIBA World Championship hosted outside South America.

Competing nations

Venues

Preliminary round

Group A

Group B

Group C

Classification round

Final round

Final rankings

All-Tournament Team

 Krešimir Ćosić (Yugoslavia)
 Sergei Belov - (MVP) (Soviet Union)
 Modestas Paulauskas (Soviet Union)
 Ubiratan Pereira Maciel (Brazil)
 Kenny Washington (U.S.)

Top scorers (ppg)
 Shin Dong-Pa (South Korea) 32.6
 Davis Peralta (Panama) 20
 Jiri Zidek Sr. (Czechoslovakia) 19.3
 Pedro Chappe Garcia (Cuba) 18.5
 Pedro Rivas (Panama) 18.5
 Lee In-Pyo (South Korea) 18
 Omar Arrestia (Uruguay) 17.7
 Luiz Cláudio Menon (Brazil) 17.3
 Bob Molinski (Canada) 17.1
 Victor Hernandez (Uruguay) 16.5

References

External links
 
 
Obeležili šampionsku titulu od pre 40 godina: Daneu okupio zlatne momke;Blic, 12 December 2010

 
1970
International basketball competitions hosted by Yugoslavia
1970 in basketball
1969–70 in Yugoslav basketball
Sports competitions in Ljubljana
Sports competitions in Sarajevo
Sports competitions in Skopje
Sport in Split, Croatia
May 1970 sports events in Europe
1970s in Sarajevo
1970s in Skopje
1970s in Ljubljana
Sport in Karlovac
1970 in Croatian sport
1970 in Bosnia and Herzegovina
1970 in Slovenia
1970 in the Socialist Republic of Macedonia